The Makauwahi Cave is the largest limestone cave found in Hawaii.  It lies on the south coast of the island of Kauai, in the Māhāulepū Valley close to Māhāulepū Beach, and is important for its paleoecological and archaeological values. It is reached via a sinkhole and has been described as “…maybe the richest fossil site in the Hawaiian Islands, perhaps in the entire Pacific Island region”.

History
Though known historically by the inhabitants of the island, and used as a grave site by ancient Hawaiians, the cave’s paleontological value was first realized in 1992 by David Burney, Lida Pigott Burney, Helen F. James and Storrs L. Olson, who found the cave’s access sinkhole while searching for fossil sites on the south coast of Kauai.  The traditional name of the cave, Makauwahi, or “smoke eye” in Hawaiian, was rediscovered in 2000 by a local archaeologist, William Pila Kikuchi, who found the name in a high school student’s essay written over a century previously.

In 2004 the Burneys acquired a lease on the cave property, now the  Makauwahi Cave Reserve, which is subject to environmental restoration after having been used for sugarcane and maize farming before being abandoned to weeds. The area is being planted with threatened native plants, such as the local Pritchardia palm.

Description

The site is apparently geologically unique in the Hawaiian Islands, comprising a sinkhole paleolake in a cave formed in eolianite limestone. The paleolake contains nearly 10,000 years of sedimentary record; since the discovery of Makauwahi as a fossil site, excavations have found pollen, seeds, diatoms, invertebrate shells, and Polynesian artifacts, as well as thousands of bird and fish bones.

The findings document not only the conditions before human colonization of the Hawaiian islands, but also the millennium of human occupation with the drastic ecological changes that occurred since first Polynesians, and later Europeans and Asians, arrived in the islands along with a suite of invasive alien species. They reveal the existence of a large number of native birds that became extinct as a result. The cave has also shown that certain plants previously believed to be Polynesian introductions, such as Kou (Cordia subcordata) and Hala (Pandanus tectorius), existed on the islands prior to human settlement.

Remains of some 40 species of birds have been found in the cave; half of these species are now extinct.  New discoveries of extinct species include the turtle-jawed moa-nalo (Chelychelynechen quassus), the blind and flightless Kaua'i mole duck (Talpanas lippa), and the Kauai palila (Loxioides kikuichi).

The Kauaʻi cave wolf spider, also known as the "blind spider", is only known to occur in this cave and in a few lava tubes in the area.

See also
 Ancient Hawaii
 List of sinkholes of the United States
 Paleoecology

References

Sources

External links
 Official website of Makauwahi Cave Reserve
 NTBG: Rooted in the Past, Growing in the Future

Archaeological sites in Hawaii
Caves of Hawaii
Landforms of Kauai
Limestone caves
Sinkholes of the United States